Palapa is a series of Communications satellites owned by Indosat, an Indonesian telecommunications company (formerly by Perumtel and then by PT Satelit Palapa Indonesia/Satelindo). Starting with the first in July 1976, at which time Indonesia became the first developing country to operate its own domestic satellite system. The estimated cost for the project was US$1 billion.

History 

Palapa-A2 was launched on 10 March 1977.

The name "Palapa" was bestowed by then Indonesian President Suharto, after the Palapa oath sworn by Gajah Mada, the Prime Minister of Majapahit Kingdom, in 1334. According to the Pararaton (Book of Kings), Gajah Mada swore that he would not taste any palapa (historians suggest it refers to spice or a kind of flavouring), as long as he had not succeeded in unifying Nusantara (the Indonesian archipelago). After watching the launching of the satellite via television in Jakarta, President Suharto revealed his reason on naming the satellite "palapa"; to show that Indonesia had a glorious past, and also hope that the system can unite the archipelago.

Palapa-B1 was deployed by the STS-7 shuttle mission on 18 June 1983. Palapa-B2 was launched from STS-41-B on 3 February 1984, to be put into service afterward, but the perigee kick motor (also known as the Payload Assist Module, or PAM) on the satellite failed during its approach to geosynchronous orbit, placing it at an improper and inoperable low Earth orbit. It was retrieved on 16 November 1984, by the STS-51A mission of NASA's Space Shuttle, where it was brought back to Earth. The Space Shuttle mission to retrieve Palapa-B2 as well as the Westar-6 satellite which shared the launch payload with Palapa-B2, was partially funded by the insurance companies led by Lloyd's of London who insured the launch of those two satellites. Palapa-B2P was launched on 20 March 1987. Palapa-B2 was renamed as Palapa-B2R and launched on 13 April 1990. Palapa-B4 was launched on 14 May 1992.

Palapa-C1 was launched on 1 February 1996. Palapa-C2 was launched on 16 May 1996.

The Palapa-D satellite was manufactured by Thales Alenia Space and launched aboard a Chinese Long March 3B launch vehicle on 31 August 2009. However it failed to reach the intended orbit following a failure of the third stage of the launch vehicle to reignite as planned. Spacebus satellite bus was maneuvered into the correct geosynchronous orbit by September 2009, but this left it with only enough fuel for 10 years in orbit. This US$200 million satellite has more transponders than its predecessors (40 transponders, Palapa-C2 only has 36). 16 (40%) of its transponders are used by Indosat for their own purposes while the other 24 (60%) are rented to others. Indosat used Palapa-D for their broadband internet service (IM2) with Ku-band technology (12/14 GHz). At the end of October 2009, Palapa D started its airing operations.

Lighthouse project 
The Palapa project was one of the Lighthouse projects instituted during the New Order period to build national pride. Other lighthouse projects during the New Order included transport infrastructure, the Taman Mini Indonesia Indah theme park and the national aircraft company. Most of these involved extravagant inauguration ceremonies with the officials who oversaw the projects in the spotlight. In the inauguration ceremony of the Palapa satellite system, President Suharto used a switch with 17 jewels (17 is the date of Indonesia's Proclamation of Independence) in the shape of a traditional dagger or kris. Besides symbolizing national unity and concretely helping unite the country as the satellite served its purpose as communication infrastructure, the satellite also tied advanced technology to Javanese tradition as epitomized by the inauguration ceremony.

References

External links 
 Gunter's Space Page - information on Palapa-B
 Palapa A at Boeing Palapa-A
 Palapa-C2 at Lyngsat
 Palapa-D at Lyngsat
 

1976 establishments in Indonesia
Communications satellites
Communications in Indonesia
Space program of Indonesia